Ebba Årsjö (born 12 January 2001) is a Swedish para alpine skier who competed at the 2022 Winter Paralympics.

Career
Årsjö competed at the 2021 World Para Snow Sports Championships where she won gold medals in the slalom, and parallel event.

She competed at the 2022 Winter Paralympics and won gold medals in the super combined and slalom standing events. She also won the bronze medal in the downhill standing event. In 2022, she received the Victoria Award.

On 9 November 2022, she announced she would no longer compete in downhill skiing.

Personal life
She was born with Klippel–Trénaunay syndrome which resulted in muscle reduction in her right leg.

References 

Living people
2001 births
Swedish female alpine skiers
Alpine skiers at the 2022 Winter Paralympics
Medalists at the 2022 Winter Paralympics
Paralympic gold medalists for Sweden
Paralympic bronze medalists for Sweden
Paralympic medalists in alpine skiing
21st-century Swedish women